Katharina Berger could refer to:
Katharina Berger (actor), German actress
Katharina Heinroth née Berger, German zoologist